My Field Trip to Planet 9 is the debut studio album by Justin Warfield. It was released on Qwest Records on July 13, 1993.

Critical reception
Jason Ankeny of AllMusic gave the album 4 stars out of 5, saying, "The hip-hop debut of Justin Warfield is built around old-school rhythms fleshed out with some intriguing samples, drawn largely from the canon of '60s psychedelic rock." Geoffrey Himes of The Washington Post said, "[Warfield's] raps, with their tired mix of criminal boasting, gratuitous weirdness and hip-hop cliches, leave almost no impression at all."

In 2015, Fact placed it at number 43 on the "50 Best Trip-Hop Albums of All Time" list.

Track listing

Personnel
Credits adapted from liner notes.
 Justin Warfield – vocals, production, mixing
 QDIII – production, mixing
 Prince Paul – production, mixing
 Ellis Dee – vocals
 Scott Harding – guitar, recording, mixing
 Goffrey Moore – bass guitar
 Michael Blake – saxophone
 Steven Bernstein – trumpet
 Bob Morse – recording, mixing
 Jason Roberts – recording
 Brian Gardner – mastering
 Kevin Kosmann – art direction
 Anne Elliott Cutting – photography

References

External links
 

1993 debut albums
Qwest Records albums
Albums produced by Prince Paul (producer)
Albums produced by Quincy Jones III
Justin Warfield albums